An empath is someone with unusually high empathy.

Empath may also refer to:

 Empath (album), by Devin Townsend, 2019
 Empath (band), an American noise punk band 
 Empath (comics), a fictional mutant in the Marvel universe
 "The Empath", an episode of Star Trek: The Original Series

See also 

 Empathy (disambiguation)